De Babuurstermolen is a smock mill in Tjerkwerd, Friesland, Netherlands which was built in 1882 and has been restored to working order. Designated as being in reserve, it is listed as a Rijksmonument.

History
De Babuurstermolen was built in 1882 by millwright Gerben van Wierum of Janum, Friesland at a cost of ƒ7,850 or ƒ8,750. It drained the  Exmoarsterheim polder. The mill was set to work for the first time on 30 November 1882. Another mill was built nearby at the same time. It burnt down in 1913 and was not rebuilt.

In 1930, the wooden windshaft was replaced by a cast-iron one. One of the wooden sailstocks broke in the autumn on 1945. The mill was worked on two sails until 1948 when a new pair of sails were fitted by the firm Hubert of Sneek, Friesland. In 1963, the wooden Archimedes' screw was replaced by a steel one. The work was carried out by Bouwbedrijf Van Zuiden of Tjerkwerd. In September 1964, a sailstock broke, and the mill ran with two sails until 1965, when a new pair of sails were fitted nu millwright Christiaan Bremer of Adorp, Groningen. The mill was working until 1990, when a new pumping station took over its work. The mill was sold to Stichting De Fryske Mole on 7 February, the 45th mill bought by that organisation. In 2006, the mill was officially designated as being held in reserve. As of 2014, the mill is under restoration. It is listed as a Rijksmonument, №39431.

Description

De Babuurstermolen is what the Dutch describe as a Grondzeiler. It is a two-storey smock mill on a single-storey base. There is no stage, the sails reaching almost to ground level. The mill is winded by tailpole and winch. The smock is clad in horizontal boards, overlaid with shingles, whilst the cap has vertical boards covered with zinc sheets. The sails are Common sails. The sails are carried on a cast iron windshaft, which was cast by the IJzergieterij J M de Muinck Keizer, Martenshoek, Groningen in 1903. The windshaft carries the brake wheel which has 59 cogs. This drives the wallower (33 cogs) at  the top of the upright shaft. At the bottom of the upright shaft there are two crown wheels The upper crown wheel, which has 43 cogs drives an Archimedes' screw via a crown wheel. The lower crown wheel, which has 40 cogs is carried on the axle of an Archimedes' screw, which is used to drain the polder. The screw is  diameter. It is inclined at 23.5°. Each revolution of the screw lifts  of water.

Public access
De Babuurstermolen is open on Wednesday and Saturdays from 13:00 to 16:30, or by appointment.

References

Windmills in Friesland
Windmills completed in 1882
Smock mills in the Netherlands
Windpumps in the Netherlands
Agricultural buildings in the Netherlands
Rijksmonuments in Friesland
Octagonal buildings in the Netherlands